The 2017 Ischia earthquake occurred in the island of Ischia, Campania, in southern Italy. The main shock occurred at 20:57 CEST (18:57 UTC) on 21 August 2017, and was rated 3.9  or 4.2  on the moment magnitude scale.

Despite the moderate magnitude, several buildings and a church collapsed. One woman died in Casamicciola Terme after being hit by rubble that fell from a church. Another woman died when her house collapsed.

Damage and debates
The collapse of several buildings and the death of two women created much controversy and debate in Italy, because many geologists stated that with a moderate magnitude quake, modern buildings should not collapse.

Moreover, Ischia is a zone with a high number of irregular buildings, and many critics considered the poor construction materials as the main cause for the death of the two women and for the damage.

The sharp increase of the population between 1950s and 1980s and the growing inflow of tourists increased the anthropic pressure on the island. Significant acreage of land previously used for agriculture has been developed for the construction of houses or residential buildings. Most of this development took place without any planning and building permits. Many houses and structures across the island sustained moderate to severe damage when the earthquake hit.

See also
List of earthquakes in 2017
List of earthquakes in Italy
1883 Casamicciola earthquake

References

Further reading

External links

2017 earthquakes
Earthquakes in Italy
2017 in Italy
2017 disasters in Italy
August 2017 events in Italy
History of Campania
Ischia